Great American may refer to:

Buildings and structures
Great American Ball Park, a Major League Baseball park in Cincinnati, Ohio named for Great American Insurance Group
Great American Music Hall, a concert hall in San Francisco, California
Great American Tower, a high-rise office building in Phoenix, Arizona, U.S.
Great American Tower at Queen City Square, a skyscraper in Cincinnati, Ohio, U.S.

Business
Great American Bank, western U.S. bank headquartered in San Diego
Great American Insurance Company, the insurance division of American Financial Group
The Great American Bagel Bakery, a restaurant franchise
Great American Broadcasting, a former name of defunct media conglomerate Taft Broadcasting
Great American Cookies, a chain of franchised gourmet cookie stores

Nature
Great American Desert, a term used in the 19th century to describe the western part of the Great Plains east of the Rocky Mountains in North America, and now sometimes used to describe the arid region of the Southwest, which includes parts of northern Mexico and the four deserts of North America
Great American Insurance Group and Great American Financial Resources, divisions of American Financial Group
Great American Interchange, a paleozoogeographic event in which land and freshwater fauna migrated from North America via Central America to South America and vice versa

Sports
Great American Conference, an American college athletic conference
Great American Mountain Rally, an automotive rally once held in November in New England, U.S.
Great American Stakes, a defunct American Thoroughbred horse race

Other uses
Great American Brass Band Festival, an annual music festival held in Danville, Kentucky, U.S.
Great American Train Show, a now-defunct traveling U.S. model train show

See also
 Great America (disambiguation)
 Great Americans (disambiguation)